Kent Devereaux is an American composer, director, academic administrator, and the 12th and current president of Goucher College. He was previously the president of the New Hampshire Institute of Art (NHIA) from 2015 to 2019.

Education
Devereaux attended the University of California, Santa Cruz and Cornish College of the Arts in Seattle, where he graduated magna cum laude with a B.F.A. in music composition (1982). His teachers included Lou Harrison, Anthony Braxton, and Gil Evans. He briefly studied computer science at Stanford University and earned an M.F.A. in Art from the School of the Art Institute of Chicago (1985), where he was an Andrew W. Mellon Fellow.

Career

Academia 
From 1985 to 1993, Devereaux served on the faculty of the School of the Art Institute of Chicago with a one-year appointment at the California Institute of the Arts. Additional academic appointments include serving as Senior Vice President and Dean of Curriculum at Kaplan University from 2001 to 2008.

He also served as professor and chair of the music department at Cornish College of the Arts from 2008 to 2014. While there, he curated the college's presenting series, Cornish Presents, and co-founded and directed the Seattle Jazz Experience youth jazz festival.

Devereaux joined the New Hampshire Institute of Art (NHIA) as president in 2015. Devereaux's initiatives at NHIA included co-founding the Manchester Cultural District Coalition, which advocated for the city to establish an official cultural district, the launching of a new Certificate in Creative Placemaking program, and the formation of an academic partnership with the University of New Hampshire at Manchester. 

On July 1, 2019, Devereaux was named as President of Goucher College.

Outside of higher education, Devereaux served as Senior Vice President and Product Development at Encyclopædia Britannica, helping the publisher transform from a print to online business.

Music 
As a composer and director, Devereaux's work includes collaborations with artists from around the world and performances at Chicago's Steppenwolf Theatre and the Walker Arts Center. He has been a recipient of grants from the National Endowment for the Arts the National Endowment for the Humanities, and the Rockefeller Foundation, among others.

Personal life 
Devereaux is married to documentary film editor Jan Sutcliffe, whom he met in Chicago shortly after finishing graduate school. They have one son, Daniel who lives in New York.

References

Year of birth missing (living people)
Living people
American male composers
21st-century American composers
People from Aptos, California
University of California, Santa Cruz alumni
Cornish College of the Arts alumni
Stanford University alumni
School of the Art Institute of Chicago alumni
School of the Art Institute of Chicago faculty
21st-century American male musicians
Presidents of Goucher College